Apple Pie is an American sitcom that aired for only two episodes on ABC on September 23 and September 30, 1978.

Overview
Rue McClanahan starred as Ginger-Nell Hollyhock, a single and lonely hairdresser who lives in Kansas City, Missouri, during the Great Depression year of 1933. When Ginger-Nell places classified ads in the local newspapers, she recruits a group of wacky relatives – a con-man husband, Fast Eddie Murtaugh; a tap-dancing daughter, Anna Marie Hollyhock; a son who wanted to fly like a bird, Junior Hollyhock; and a tottering old blind grandfather, Grandpa Hollyhock – all of whom come to live together for the laughs.

Cast
Rue McClanahan as Ginger-Nell Hollyhock
Dabney Coleman as Fast Eddie Murtaugh
Jack Gilford as Grandpa Hollyhock
Caitlin O'Heaney as Anna Marie Hollyhock
Derrel Maury as Junior Hollyhock

Episodes

Reception
When the sitcom Maude ended in April 1978, producer Norman Lear created Apple Pie as a star vehicle for Rue McClanahan, who had played Vivian Harmon on Maude. The show was not well received and was canceled after two episodes, though eight had been filmed under the direction of Peter Bonerz.

Apple Pie was broadcast Saturday nights on ABC at 8:30 p.m. during its brief two-week run. It was videotaped before a live audience at Metromedia Square in Hollywood, California.

References

External links

1978 American television series debuts
1978 American television series endings
1970s American sitcoms
American Broadcasting Company original programming
Television shows set in Kansas City, Missouri
Television series set in 1933
Television series by Sony Pictures Television
Television series created by Norman Lear